Upwardly Global is a 501(c)(3) non-profit organization that helps immigrant and refugee professionals rebuild their careers and find meaningful employment in the United States. Established in 2000, Upwardly Global is the first and longest-serving organization in this field, having helped more than 9,500 internationally trained professionals secure thriving-wage jobs in the U.S.

Upwardly Global's resources include specialized coaching, industry-based support, mentorship, networking, reskilling opportunities, and assistance in obtaining up-to-date credentials and licenses.

In 2022, Upwardly Global placed more than 1,000 immigrant and refugee professional job seekers in high-demand industries such as healthcare, IT, finance, and business. Program alumni earned an average income of $66,000, with a typical retention rate of 90% one year after placement.

Mission 

Upwardly Global’s mission is to eliminate employment barriers for immigrant and refugee professionals and  advance the inclusion of their skills into the U.S. economy.

A growing share of new arrivals to the U.S have advanced degrees and experience. Almost half of immigrants entering the U.S. between 2011 and 2015 had at least a bachelor's degree. However, nearly 2.3 million immigrants with college degrees are unemployed or working well below their skill level. The Migration Policy Institute calls this loss of talent "brain waste," resulting in internationally trained immigrants losing out on more than $39 billion in wages annually and governments missing out on $10 billion in tax payments.

To qualify for Upwardly Global's program, candidates must have:

 Arrived in the U.S. within the last seven years
 A bachelor’s degree or professional training equivalent
 An intermediate or advanced level of English
 Work authorization from this list
 No experience working in the U.S. in their professional industry (for example, an immigrant who worked in finance in their home country and has worked in a full-time finance job in the U.S. may not qualify)
 Live in one of the following states:
 California, Connecticut, Georgia, Illinois, Indiana, Massachusetts, Maryland, Minnesota, North Carolina, New Jersey, New York, Ohio, Pennsylvania, Tennessee, Texas, Virginia, Washington, Wisconsin, Washington D.C.

History

Beginnings 

Upwardly Global was founded in 2000 by Jane Leu in San Francisco, California. After having worked extensively with immigrants, asylees, and refugees, Jane saw a need for programs that support professionally educated and experienced immigrants in particular. Newspapers have described cases of underemployed immigrant professionals — lawyers working as gas station attendants, doctors as doormen — as the "American classic." Multiple organizations exist to assist immigrant job-seekers, but few have the resources required to assist those with professional-level backgrounds. Upwardly Global is unique in the United States as an organization that specializes in matching qualified immigrants with professional positions. Jane began working with such immigrants part-time, unpaid, from her own kitchen.

In 2000, the organization received its first official grant from the Three Guineas Fund. In the next 
few years, the list of donors expanded to include the Levi Strauss Foundation, the Draper Richards Foundation, and various private donors. Nikki Cicerani served as the organization's President and CEO from 2009-2018, leading the organization's expansion from two metropolitan areas to four, and launching online, virtual services. She currently serves on the organization's Board of Directors. In 2018, Jina Krause-Vilmar took over as the President and CEO of Upwardly Global. Jina arrived at Upwardly Global with 15 years of experience in for-profit and non-profit sectors.

Present day 
Upwardly Global now has physical offices in San Francisco, New York City, Chicago, and Washington, D.C. The organization has received numerous awards, including the 2004 Manhattan Institute Award for Social Entrepreneurship and the 2006 John F. Kennedy New Frontier Award, the 2010 E Pluribus Unum Award.

The organization receives funding from private donors, as well as from the Achelis Foundation, Ashoka: Innovators for the Public, the Alan Slifka Foundation, Cisco Systems, Community Technology, Foundation for California, the Draper Richards Foundation, the Gimbel Foundation, the Johnson Foundation, JP Morgan Chase, the Leitner Family Foundation, New Profit, Inc., the New York Times Foundation, the Robin Hood Foundation, the San Francisco Foundation, the Third Millennium Foundation, Three Guineas Fund, Wells Fargo, and more.

Most recently, Upwardly Global has been working to address restrictive state licensing laws. 165,000 internationally trained healthcare professionals live in the U.S. with a range of education, skills, and experiences—including past pandemics and crises like the Ebola and SARS outbreaks. However, complex state licensing laws, misunderstandings of credentials, limited professional networks, and other systemic barriers leave these healthcare professionals on the sidelines—even during the height of the COVID-19 pandemic, when frontline support was scarce. Upwardly Global is working with state governments to change these laws to protect patients and build needed capacity.

Strategy and outreach

Jobseekers 

Jobseekers that fit requirements have free access to Upwardly Global programs and in-person and digital services. Activities, programs and resources include:
Resume and cover letter assistance
Workshops
Networking skills
Interviewing skills
Mock interviews
Mentoring and advising by volunteers
Access to free classes to earn credentials
Submission of resumes to relevant employer partners

These programs and activities address what Upwardly Global considers a four-fold challenge for immigrant professionals:

Employer network 
Upwardly Global has partnerships with such companies as Accenture, Google, Wells Fargo, S&P Global, Standard Chartered, TD Bank.

Upwardly Global's strategy for interaction with employer partners follows a basic three-level process:

1. Education Through training, Upwardly Global works with HR professionals to expand cross-cultural hiring practices.

2. Engagement Employees of partner companies are invited to volunteer for Upwardly Global, individually or in groups. This important step increases awareness about immigrant professional potential and creates "internal advocates for global diversity."

3. Employment The final component is the intersection of needs and goals between the job seekers and companies. Upwardly Global functions similarly to a recruiter by steering qualified and interested candidates towards open positions in employer partner companies.

Important Links and Resources 
Upwardly Global Application Page
Licensing Guides
Upwardly Global Free Online Courses

Notes 
 Upwardly Global places skilled immigrants in jobs worthy of their talents.. Standford Social Innovation. Spring 2010.

 Bar Serves as Classroom for Immigrants Learning Job-Hunting Skills.. The New York Times. February 28, 2010.

 Non-Profit Helps Immigrants Launch New Careers.. CBS 5. May 27, 2009

 Fact Sheet on the Foreign Born: Language and Education Characteristics. 2007. The Migration Policy Institute. Retrieved August 14, 2007.

 Immigration Policy Brief - New Census Bureau Data Underscore Importance of Immigrants in US Labor Force 2007. Paral, Rob. The American Immigration Law Foundation. Retrieved August 15, 2007.

 More immigrants, more jobs. July 11, 2005. The Wall Street Journal. Retrieved August 14, 2007.

 The 2006 John F. Kennedy New Frontier Awards. The John F. Kennedy Library Foundation. Retrieved August 14, 2007.

 Upwardly Global: About Us: FAQs. Upwardly Global. Retrieved August 13, 2007.

 IV. Review of the list of least developed countries. March 2003. The United Nations. Retrieved August 14, 2007.

 Upwardly Global: Impact Statistics. Upwardly Global. Retrieved July 14, 2021.

 GuideStar Report: Upwardly Global GuideStar. Retrieved August 14, 2007.

 Legal Immigrants Have Trouble Finding Jobs May 30, 2006. The Wall Street Journal. Retrieved August 14, 2007.

References

External links 
 Upwardly Global
 Upwardly Global on Youtube

Non-profit organizations based in California
Non-profit organizations based in San Francisco